They Mohawk Valley Comets are a former professional ice hockey team based in Utica, New York. They were a member of the North American Hockey League from 1973 to 1977.

Season-by-season results

1973 establishments in New York (state)
1977 disestablishments in New York (state)
Cincinnati Stingers minor league affiliates
Ice hockey clubs established in 1973
Ice hockey clubs disestablished in 1977
Ice hockey teams in New York (state)
Indianapolis Racers minor league affiliates
North American Hockey League (1973–1977) teams
Toronto Toros minor league affiliates